Glen Wilson (born 26 March 1971 in Upper Hutt) is a squash coach and former professional squash player from New Zealand.

As a player, Wilson was a three-time New Zealand national champion, and reached a career-high world ranking of World No. 24.

He won a mixed doubles bronze medal at the 1998 Commonwealth Games (partnering Sarah Cook), a mixed doubles gold medal at the 2002 Commonwealth Games (partnering Leilani Joyce), and a mixed doubles silver medal at the 2004 World Doubles Squash Championships (partnering Shelley Kitchen).

Wilson is currently the head coach at Howick Squash Club in Auckland. Of Māori descent, Wilson affiliates to the Waikato iwi.

References

External links
 

1971 births
Living people
New Zealand male squash players
Commonwealth Games bronze medallists for New Zealand
Commonwealth Games gold medallists for New Zealand
Commonwealth Games medallists in squash
Squash players at the 1998 Commonwealth Games
Squash players at the 2002 Commonwealth Games
Squash players at the 2006 Commonwealth Games
Sportspeople from Upper Hutt
Waikato Tainui people
New Zealand Māori sportspeople
Medallists at the 1998 Commonwealth Games
Medallists at the 2002 Commonwealth Games